The Serapeum of Alexandria in the Ptolemaic Kingdom was an ancient Greek temple built by Ptolemy III Euergetes (reigned 246–222 BC) and dedicated to Serapis, who was made the protector of Alexandria. There are also signs of Harpocrates. It has been referred to as the daughter of the Library of Alexandria. The site has been heavily plundered.

History

The site is located on a rocky plateau, overlooking land and sea. By all detailed accounts, the Serapeum was the largest and most magnificent of all temples in the Greek quarter of Alexandria.

Besides the image of the god, the temple precinct housed an offshoot collection of the great Library of Alexandria.  The geographer Strabo tells that this stood in the west of the city.

Nothing now remains above ground, except the enormous Pompey's Pillar. According to Rowe and Rees 1956, accounts of Serapeum's still standing buildings they saw there have been left by Aphthonius, the Greek rhetorician of Antioch "who visited it about A.D. 315", and Rufinus, "a Christian who assisted at the destruction of [it] during the end of the fourth century"; the Pillar marks the "Acropolis" of the Serapeum in the account by Aphthonius, that is, "the upper part of the great Serapeum area".

Closure of the Serapeum

The Serapeum of Alexandria was closed in July of 325 AD, likely on the orders of the Christian emperor Constantine. Then, in 391 AD, religious riots broke out, according to Wace:

Destruction

The Serapeum in Alexandria was destroyed by a Christian mob or Roman soldiers in 391 (although the date is debated). Several conflicting accounts for the context of the destruction of the Serapeum exist.

Whichever the cause, the destruction of the Serapeum, described by Christian writers Tyrannius Rufinus and Sozomen, was but the most spectacular of such conflicts, according to Peter Brown.  Several other ancient and modern authors, instead, have interpreted the destruction of the Serapeum in Alexandria as representative of the triumph of Christianity and an example of the attitude of the Christians towards pagans. However, Peter Brown frames it against a long-term backdrop of frequent mob violence in the city, where the Greek and Jewish quarters had fought during four hundred years, since the 1st century BC. Also, Eusebius mentions street-fighting in Alexandria between Christians and non-Christians, occurring as early as 249.   There is evidence that non-Christians had taken part in citywide struggles both for and against Athanasius of Alexandria in 341 and 356.   Similar accounts are found in the writings of Socrates of Constantinople. R. McMullan further reports that, in 363 (almost 30 years earlier), George of Cappadocia was killed for his repeated acts of pointed outrage, insult, and pillage of the most sacred treasures of the city.

Whatever the prior events, the Serapeum of Alexandria was not rebuilt. After the destruction, a monastery was established, a church was built for St. John the Baptist, known as Angelium or Evangelium. However, the church fell to ruins around 600 AD, restored by Pope Isaac of Alexandria (681–684 AD), and finally destroyed in the 10th century. In the 20th century, a Muslim cemetery, Bāb Sidra, was located at the site.

Christian version

According to early Christian sources, bishop Pope Theophilus I of Alexandria was the Nicene patriarch when the decrees of emperor Theodosius I forbade public observances of any rites but Christian. Theodosius I had gradually made the previously respected pagan feasts into workdays, forbidden public sacrifices, and closed pagan temples. The decree promulgated in 391 that "no one is to go to the sanctuaries, [or] walk through the temples" resulted in the abandonment of many temples throughout the Empire, which set the stage for widespread practice of converting or replacing these sites with Christian churches.

In Alexandria, Bishop Theophilus obtained legal authority over one such temple of Dionysus , which he intended to convert into a church. During the renovations, the objects of pagan mystery still held within, especially the cultic phalli of Dionysus, were removed and exhibited in a procession of exposure, offense, and ridicule by the Patriarch; This would incite crowds of pagans to seek revenge.  They would kill and wound many Christians before seizing the Serapeum, still the most imposing of the city's remaining sanctuaries, barricading themselves inside, taking captured Christians with them. These sources report that the captives were forced to offer sacrifices to the banned deities, and that those who refused were tortured (their shins broken) and ultimately cast into caves that had been built for blood sacrifices. The trapped pagans plundered the Serapeum (Rufinus & MacMullen 1984).

A decree was issued by Theodosius, offering the offending pagans pardon and calling for the destruction of all pagan images, suggesting that these were at the origin of the commotion. Consequently, the Serapeum was either destroyed, or (As per Sozomen) converted into a Christian temple; As were the buildings dedicated to the Egyptian god Canopus. The wave of destruction of non-Christian idols spread throughout Egypt in the following weeks, as documented by a marginal illustration on papyrus from a world chronicle written in Alexandria in the early 5th century, which shows Theophilus in triumph (illustration, above left); the cult image of Serapis, crowned with the modius, is visible within the temple at the bottom.

Pagan version
An alternate account of the incident is found in Lives of the Philosophers and Sophists (LCL vol. 134, pp. 416-425) by Eunapius, the pagan historian of later Neoplatonism. Here, an unprovoked Christian mob successfully used military-like tactics to destroy the Serapeum and steal anything that may have survived the attack. According to Eunapius, the remains of criminals and slaves, who had been occupying the Serapeum at the time of the attack, were appropriated by Christians, placed in (surviving) pagan temples, and venerated as martyrs.

Sozomen's account

Rufinus' account

Excavations

Architecture has been traced to an early Ptolemaic and a second Roman period. The excavations at the site of the column of Diocletian in 1944 yielded the foundation deposits of the Serapeion.  These are two sets of ten plaques, one each of gold, silver, bronze, Egyptian faience, sun-dried Nile mud, and five of opaque glass.  The inscription that Ptolemy III Euergetes built the Serapeion, in Greek and Egyptian, marks all plaques; evidence suggests that Parmeniskos (Parmenion) was assigned as architect.

The foundation deposits of a temple dedicated to Harpocrates from the reign of Ptolemy IV Philopator were also found within the enclosure walls.

Signs point to a first destruction during the Kitos War in 116 AD. It has been suggested it was then rebuilt under Hadrian.  This is supported with the 1895 find of a black diorite statue, representing Serapis in his Apis bull incarnation with the sun disk between his horns; an inscription dates it to the reign of Hadrian (117–138).

It has also been suggested that there was worship of the goddess of health, marriage, and wisdom Isis.  Subterranean galleries beneath the temple were most probably the site of the mysteries of Serapis. Granite columns suggest a Roman rebuilding and widening of the Alexandrine Serapeum in AD 181–217. Excavations recovered 58 bronze coins, and 3 silver coins, with dates up to 211. The torso of a marble statue of Mithras was found in 1905/6.

Statues

According to fragments, there were statues of the twelve gods. Mimaut mentioned in the 19th century, nine standing statues holding rolls, which would coincident with the nine goddesses of the arts, reportedly present at the Library of Alexandria. Eleven statues were found at Saqqara. A review of "Les Statues Ptolémaïques du Sarapieion de Memphis" noted they were probably sculpted in the 3rd century with limestone and stucco, some standing others sitting. Rowe and Rees 1956 suggested that both scenes in the Serapeum of Alexandria and Saqqara, share a similar theme, such as with Plato's Academy mosaic, with Saqqara figures attributed to: "(1) Pindare, (2) Démétrios de Phalère, (3) x (?), (4) Orphée (?) aux oiseaux, (5) Hésiode, (6) Homère, (7) x (?), (8) Protagoras, (9) Thalès, (10) Héraclite, (11) Platon, (12) Aristote (?)."

References

External links

Rufinus – "The Destruction of the Serapeum A.D. 391"
Richard Stillwell, ed. Princeton Encyclopedia of Classical Sites, 1976: "Alexandria, Egypt: Serapeion"

3rd-century BC religious buildings and structures
Ancient libraries
Buildings and structures completed in the 3rd century BC
Buildings and structures demolished in the 4th century
Destroyed temples
Egyptology
Hellenistic architecture
Persecution of pagans in the late Roman Empire
Ptolemaic Alexandria
Serapeum